Spaceship to Saturn is a juvenile science fiction novel, the tenth in Hugh Walters' "Chris Godfrey of U.N.E.X.A." series. It was published in 1967 in the UK by Faber and in the US by Criterion Books and in Portugal under the title Voo para Saturno by Edições Dêagã in 1975.

Plot summary
The length of the trip to Saturn means that the crew will undergo 'hypothermia' for the duration of the flight, however a massive increase in meteor activity around Saturn threatens to cancel the mission as the computer on Earth will be unable to manoeuvre the craft at such long distances to avoid collisions.  The solution - instantaneous telepathy; twins Gill and Gail maintain a telepathic carrier-wave even under hypothermia which can be modulated to carry telemetry.  A landing is attempted on Titan but problems arise requiring the ship to be flown through the Cassini division, a narrow gap in the rings of Saturn...

External links
Spaceship to Saturn page
Review

1967 British novels
1967 science fiction novels
Chris Godfrey of U.N.E.X.A. series
Faber and Faber books
Rings of Saturn in fiction
Fiction set on Saturn
Fiction set on Titan (moon)